Norman Clement Neeson (19 February 1934 – 16 July 2020) was an  Australian rules footballer who played with North Melbourne in the Victorian Football League (VFL).

Neeson was later captain coach of Ainslie Football Club in the Australian Capital Territory from 1961 to 1965.

Notes

External links 

Norm Neeson's playing statistics from The VFA Project

1934 births
2020 deaths
Australian rules footballers from Victoria (Australia)
North Melbourne Football Club players
Coburg Football Club players
Ainslie Football Club players